USS Rickwood (SP-597) was a United States Navy patrol vessel in commission from 1917 to 1919.

Rickwood was built as the private motorboat Ethel M. Ward by the Matthews Boat Company at Port Clinton, Ohio, in 1910. She later was renamed Rickwood.

On 9 June 1917, the U.S. Navy acquired Rickwood from her owner, A. H. Woodward of Woodward, Alabama, for use as a section patrol boat during World War I. She was commissioned as USS Rickwood (SP-597) on 18 June 1918.

Assigned to Naval Air Station Pensacola at Pensacola, Florida, Rickwood patrolled the Florida coast near Pensacola for the rest of World War I and into January 1919. She also recovered downed aircrews and aircraft and performed other local search and rescue work, provided ferry service between the naval air station and the city of Pensacola, and performed local towing work.

On 28 January 1919, Rickwood was reassigned from Naval Air Station Pensacola to Naval Station Pensacola.

Rickwood was returned to Woodward on 3 March 1919. After that, she had a long civilian career, remaining on mercantile registers until 1955.

References

Department of the Navy Naval History and Heritage Command Online Library of Selected Images: Civilian Ships: Ethel M. Ward (American Motor Boat, 1910). Later renamed Rickwood. Served as USS Rickwood (SP-597) in 1917-1919
NavSource Online: Section Patrol Craft Photo Archive Rickwood (SP 597)

Patrol vessels of the United States Navy
World War I patrol vessels of the United States
Ships built in Port Clinton, Ohio
1910 ships